Judah Benzion "Ben" Segal, FBA (21 June 1912 – 23 October 2003, Edgware, Middlesex) was Professor of Semitic Languages at the School of Oriental and African Studies.

His father was Professor Moshe Zvi Segal and his brother was the doctor and Labour Party politician Samuel Segal.  He had two daughters; one is Prof. Naomi Segal.

Education 
 Magdalen College School, Oxford
 St. Catharine's College, Cambridge. Jarrett Scholar, 1932; John Stewart of Rannoch Scholar in Hebrew, 1933; 1st Class Oriental Langs Tripos, 1935; Tyrwhitt Scholar and Mason Prizeman, 1936. BA (Cambridge), 1935, MA 1938; DPhil (Oxford) 1939.
 Colours, Cambridge University Boxing Club, 1935, 1936.

Career 
 Mansel Research Exhibitioner, St. John's College, Oxford, 1936–39; James Mew Scholar, 1937.
 Deputy Assistant Director, Public Security, Sudan Government, 1939–41
 Served in World War II, GHQ, MEF, 1942–44, Captain; Education Officer, British Military Administration, Tripolitania, 1945–46.  He was awarded a Military Cross in 1942.
 School of Oriental and African Studies from 1946; Head of Department of Near and Middle East, 1961–68; Professor 1961–79, then Emeritus Professor; Honorary Fellow 1983.
 Visiting Lecturer, Ain Shams University, Cairo, 1979
 Research Fellow, Hebrew University, Jerusalem, 1980
 Leverhulme Emeritus Fellowship, South India, 1981

Involvement in Jewish community 
 Principal, Leo Baeck College, 1982–85; President, 1985-2003
 Member, Council of Christians and Jews
 President: North Western Reform Synagogue
 President: British Association for Jewish Studies, 1980
 Vice-president, Reform Synagogues of Great Britain, 1985–91

Honours 
 Fellow of the British Academy, 1968
 Freedom, City of Urfa, Turkey, 1973

Publications 
 The Diacritical Point and the Accents in Syriac, 1953
 The Hebrew Passover, 1963
 The Sabian Mysteries. The planet cult of ancient Harran, Vanished Civilizations, 1963
 Edessa, 'the blessed city''', 1970
 Aramaic Texts From North Saqqara, 1983
 A History of the Jews of Cochin, 1993
 Aramaic and Mandaic Incantation Bowls in the British Museum, 2000
 Whisper Awhile'', 2000
 Articles in learned periodicals.

1912 births
2003 deaths
People educated at Magdalen College School, Oxford
Alumni of St Catharine's College, Cambridge
British Army personnel of World War II
Linguists from the United Kingdom
British Jews
Fellows of the British Academy
Recipients of the Military Cross
Syriacists
People associated with Leo Baeck College
Burials at Golders Green Jewish Cemetery
20th-century linguists